"Blue Period" is a song by the American alternative rock group The Smithereens. It is the fourth single released in support of their third album 11. It features singer Belinda Carlisle performing vocals.

Formats and track listing 
All songs written by Pat DiNizio
European 7" single (ENV21)
"Blue Period" – 2:53
"Maria Elena (acoustic version)" – 2:42

European CD single (ENVCD 21)
"Blue Period" – 2:53
"Room Without a View" – 4:09
"Maria Elena (acoustic version)" – 2:42

Charts

References

External links 
 

1989 songs
1990 singles
Capitol Records singles
Belinda Carlisle songs
The Smithereens songs
Song recordings produced by Ed Stasium
Songs written by Pat DiNizio